Huaquirca District is one of the seven districts of the Antabamba Province in the [Apurímac Region] in Peru.

Ethnic groups 
The people in the district are mainly indigenous citizens of Quechua descent. Quechua is the language which the majority of the population (87.92%) learnt to speak in childhood, 11.93% of the residents started speaking using the Spanish language (2007 Peru Census).

References

1945 establishments in Peru
States and territories established in 1945
Populated places established in 1945
Districts of the Antabamba Province
Districts of the Apurímac Region